Kevin O'Hanrahan Haugh (17 November 1901 – 5 April 1969) was an Irish judge who served as a Judge of the Supreme Court from 1961 to 1968, a Judge of the High Court from 1942 to 1960 and Attorney General of Ireland from 1940 to 1942.

He was born in Dublin in 1901. He was educated at Blackrock College and University College Dublin. He was called to the Bar in 1925 and he became Senior Counsel 1938. He was the Attorney General of Ireland from 1940 to 1942, a position which he resigned from in 1942, as he was appointed a Judge of the High Court. He was for many years the Probate Judge and an acknowledged authority on succession law. He became a Judge of the Supreme Court in 1961. He retired in 1968 and died the following year.

His son, also Kevin (1944–2009) followed his father's path to the Bar and the High Court; unlike his father, he was also a judge of the Circuit Court. He was an immensely popular judge whose career was cut short by his early death in 2009.

References

 

1901 births
1969 deaths
Judges of the Supreme Court of Ireland
Irish barristers
Alumni of University College Dublin
Attorneys General of Ireland
High Court judges (Ireland)
20th-century Irish lawyers
People educated at Blackrock College